The Lancashire and Yorkshire Railway (L&YR) Class 23 is a class of  steam locomotive. Their main use was for shunting and for short-trip freight working.

Construction

The Class 23  locomotives were initially built in 1876-87 by L&Y locomotive superintendent Barton Wright as a class of 280 0-6-0 tender engines. 230 of these were rebuilt as saddle tanks at Horwich Works by Aspinall between 1891 and 1900.

Ownership changes

The class was long-lived, with the first engine being withdrawn in 1926 by the London, Midland and Scottish Railway and the last surviving in use until 1964 with British Railways London Midland Region. 101 were in service at Nationalisation, 20 still in service in 1961.

Preservation
One locomotive, L&YR 752 (LMS 11456 but sold into colliery service in 1937), is preserved by the Lancashire and Yorkshire Railway Trust, having been acquired by the NCB for continued operation and as of October 2019 could move under its own steam despite overhaul being incomplete. This progressed at the East Lancashire Railway in Bury using primarily their resources in close cooperation with the current owners of 752.  The locomotive was featured on an episode of the television programme "Steam Train Britain" which showed the locomotive under rebuild.  Since January 2020 752 has temporarily carried the early British Railways livery as 51456 had it not been sold to industry, and featured in various events in steam before a complete public relaunch in the East Lancashire Railway Gala event on March 6 to 8 2020.

References

23
0-6-0ST locomotives
Railway locomotives introduced in 1891
Standard gauge steam locomotives of Great Britain
Freight locomotives